Qurdanlu (also Romanized as Qūrdānlū; also known as Qūrdānlū-ye ‘Olyā) is a village in Takmaran Rural District, Sarhad District, Shirvan County, North Khorasan Province, Iran. At the 2006 census, its population was 97, in 29 families.

References 

Populated places in Shirvan County